Zehra Batool is a Pakistani politician and who is a member of the Provincial Assembly of Punjab.

Political career
Batool was elected to the Provincial Assembly of Punjab from the Constituency PP-272 (Muzaffargarh-V) in 2018 Pakistani by-elections held on October 14, 2018 on PTI ticket. This seat was vacated by her son Syed Basit Sultan Bukhari, who won both national and provincial assemblies seats. 

She deseated due to vote against party policy for Chief Minister of Punjab election  on 16 April 2022.

Early life 
She was born on August 17, 1955 at Jatoi Tehsil, Muzaffargarh District. She is daughter of Mr Khalil Ahmed. She is wife of Mr Abdullah Shah Bukhari.

References

Living people
Pakistan Tehreek-e-Insaf politicians
Politicians from Punjab, Pakistan
Year of birth missing (living people)
People from Muzaffargarh
Politicians from Muzaffargarh